Gul Bukhari is a British-Pakistani journalist and columnist. She has been residing in UK since December 2018.

In June 2018, she was abducted for few hours by unknown personnel from Lahore's cantonment area, which has heavy army presence and security checks controlled by the military. A colleague of her alleged that uniformed men were present at her abduction.

Early life and education
Bukhari was born to a military family in 1966. Her father, Major General Rehmat Ali Shah Bukhari, was a Pakistan Army general and was decorated in 1971 for Battle of Bahawalnagar.

Bukhari is a graduate of Kinnaird College for Women and Lahore University of Management Sciences.

References

Living people
1966 births
British activists
British women journalists
Pakistani women journalists
Pakistani activists
British women activists
Pakistani women activists
Pakistani columnists
Pakistani emigrants to the United Kingdom
Pakistani women columnists
Kidnappings in Pakistan
Kinnaird College for Women University alumni
Lahore University of Management Sciences alumni
People from Lahore
Naturalised citizens of the United Kingdom
Enforced disappearances in Pakistan